Earl's Seat (578 m) is the highest hill of the Campsie Fells in Central Scotland. It lies on the border of Stirlingshire and East Dunbartonshire in central Scotland. Located on a plateau in the heart of the Campsies above the village of Strathblane, its summit is marked by a trig point.

References

Mountains and hills of East Dunbartonshire
Mountains and hills of Stirling (council area)
Marilyns of Scotland
Hills of the Scottish Midland Valley